is a 1949 book by Takashi Nagai. It vividly describes his experiences as a survivor of the atomic bombing of Nagasaki. It was translated into English by William Johnston. The title refers to the bells of Urakami Cathedral, of which Nagai writes:

These are the bells that did not ring for weeks or months after the disaster. May there never be a time when they do not ring! May they ring out this message of peace until the morning of the day on which the world ends.

Initially, the book was refused publication by the American forces occupying Japan, until an appendix was added describing Japanese atrocities in the Philippines. This appendix was later removed.

Records and CDs
 July 1, 1949, performed by Ichiro Fujiyama, Mariko Ike, written by Hachiro Sato, composed by Yuji Koseki
 September 1949, performed by Yoshie Fujiwara, written and composed by Kazuo Uemoto
 1996, performed by Yumi Aikawa, composed by Yuji Koseki

Film

A film adaptation directed by Hideo Ōba was released September 23, 1950.

Modern retelling
In 2011, UK film Production Company Pixel Revolution Films announced plans to produce a film on the life of Dr. Nagai. Directors Ian and Dominic Higgins cited The Bells of Nagasaki (the book) as one of the main inspirations for making the film. The film is titled All That Remains and was released in 2016. It is the first Western film to deal directly with the atomic bombing of Nagasaki.

See also
 Hiroshima (book)

References

1949 non-fiction books
Japanese literature
Non-fiction books adapted into films
Books about the atomic bombings of Hiroshima and Nagasaki